is a former professional baseball player from Shinjuku, Tokyo, Japan.

Kohiyama was drafted in the first round of the 1992 amateur draft by the Yokohama BayStars. He was successful in his rookie year, pitching as the setup man for closer Kazuhiro Sasaki, but problems with control led the BayStars to drop him in 2001. He played with the Chinatrust Whales (a team in the Chinese Professional Baseball League) in 2002 before retiring. He currently works at TBS Radio & Communications.

He won a bronze medal in the 1992 Summer Olympics before entering the Japanese professional leagues. He pitched a shutout win against Puerto Rico in the Olympic tournament. He is the only pitcher to have recorded a shutout game in Olympic baseball.

External links
 Career statistics

1969 births
Living people
People from Shinjuku
Keio University alumni
Olympic baseball players of Japan
Olympic medalists in baseball
Olympic bronze medalists for Japan
Baseball players at the 1992 Summer Olympics
Medalists at the 1992 Summer Olympics
Japanese expatriate baseball players in Taiwan
Nippon Professional Baseball pitchers
Yokohama BayStars players
Chinatrust Whales players